Viktor Viktorovych Yanukovych (16 July 1981 – 20 March 2015) was a Ukrainian politician and Member of Parliament. He was the son of former Ukrainian President Viktor Yanukovych.

Early life and education
Yanukovych was born on 16 July 1981 in Yenakiieve, Donetsk region, to Viktor Yanukovych and Lyudmyla  Yanukovych. He had a brother named Oleksandr Yanukovych.

He graduated from high school with a silver medal in 1998.
From 1998 to 2003 he studied at Donetsk National University, majoring in "Enterprise Economy". He received a master's degree in "Enterprise Economics". On 17 June 2009, he defended his dissertation titled "Formation and implementation of state social policy" at Donetsk State University of Management, earning a PhD in public administration.

Activity
From June 2002 to September 2004, Yanukovych served as vice-president of the Donetsk regional public organization "Regional Center Spryiannia" (Promotion). 
From July 2004 to November 2004, he served as first deputy general director of SK, a limited liability company in Donetsk. 
Beginning in November 2005, he held the post of first deputy general director of BK Engineering. 
From November 2005 to 2010, he worked as deputy head of the Ukrainian youth public organization "Soyuz molodi regioniv Ukrainy" (Union of Ukrainian Youth of Regions).
Since May 2006 – MP (V and VI and VII parliamentary sessions), from the Party of Regions. 
In 2010, he became the Honorary President of the Ukrainian youth public political organization Young Regions.

During the 2012 Ukrainian parliamentary election he was re-elected into parliament.

Parliamentary activities

Yanukovych was the initiator and project manager of the Ukrainian SMS referendum "For the Russian language." The referendum, held in Ukraine from 17 January to 17 March 2006, became a public opinion poll on the question of granting Russian as the second official language. The SMS referendum was recognised by Book of Records Ukraine for "The most massive online poll in Ukraine" and "the most massive SMS poll in Ukraine."

In 2011, Parliament adopted at first reading a bill on an experiment in information technology, co-authored by Viktor Yanukovych. According to this bill, domestic IT companies will be granted a "tax holiday" for 5 years.

Viktor Yanukovych supported the policy of state patronage of the Ukrainian film industry. This policy provides for the protection and promotion of national films on both domestic and international markets through tax incentives, financial and legal support. As a result, an amendment to the Tax Code of Ukraine came into effect on 1 January 2011.

The new law states that VAT exemptions until 2016 will apply to all operations connected with the supply of national films, determined by the Law of Ukraine "On Cinematography". This covers all manufacturers, distributors and demonstrators, as well as suppliers of services for production, including replication of national and foreign films, duplicated, voiced, or subtitled by the official language in the territory Ukraine.

In 2011, the Ukrainian film budget reached a record amount - 111 million UHR. In 2010, funding was 24 million UHR. Due to the efforts of Viktor Yanukovych, the State Budget for 2012 was adopted with a record funding for the national cinema - 176 million UHR, which is one third higher than the Budget of 2011. In 2012, 37 films were selected for production, 9 of which are the debut. 30 projects have already been funded. In addition, in 2011 for the first time in the history of Ukraine, transparent competitions for the funding of locally produced short films were conducted.

In 2011, the politician stated the necessity to introduce certification of highway dividers in Ukraine. The Deputy's proposal on this relevant initiative was sent to the state motorways agency.
The first result of the work in this direction has been nationwide monitoring of the old highway dividers on Ukrainian roads.

Personal life
Viktor Yanukovych was married to Olga Korochanska. They had one son named Iliya Yanukovych.

Death
Yanukovych died on the evening of 20 March 2015 when he fell through the ice while driving his minivan on Lake Baikal. Yanukovych had driven his vehicle out on the ice near Khoboi Cape on the northern edge of Olkhon Island. Five of the passengers escaped, but Yanukovych was unable to unfasten his seat belt in time and he drowned. The Ministry of Emergencies in Irkutsk Oblast announced on BBC Ukraine that the driver's name was Viktor Davydov (Davydov was the maiden surname of Viktor's mother), but Nestor Shufrych confirmed that the deceased was a son of the former president, Viktor Yanukovych. He was buried in a Russian military cemetery at Sevastopol in Crimea. Russian authorities refused to comment on reports of Yanukovych's death and did not respond to a Ukrainian Foreign Ministry query about it. A report about the March 20, 2015 accident that killed Yanukovych was removed from the Russian Ministry of Emergencies website shortly after it was posted.

References

External links

 Official web-site of Party of Regions 

1981 births
2015 deaths
People from Yenakiieve
Ukrainian rally drivers
Ukrainian people of Belarusian descent
Ukrainian people of Russian descent
Ukrainian people of Polish descent
Party of Regions politicians
Fifth convocation members of the Verkhovna Rada
Sixth convocation members of the Verkhovna Rada
Seventh convocation members of the Verkhovna Rada
Donetsk National University alumni
Deaths by drowning
Road incident deaths in Russia
Children of national leaders
Viktor Viktorovych
Russian individuals subject to European Union sanctions
Ukrainian collaborators with Russia